Ben McKay may refer to:

 Ben McKay (politician) (1918–1976), member of the Tasmanian Legislative Council
 Ben McKay (actor), British actor
 Ben McKay (footballer) (born 1997), Australian rules footballer

See also
 Ben Mackey (born 1986), English footballer
 Benjamin Skene Mackay (1883-1930), Scottish politician and trade unionist